Cyrus Gray Luce (July 2, 1824 – March 18, 1905) was an American politician in the U.S. state of Michigan. He served as the 21st governor of Michigan.

Early life in Ohio and Indiana
Luce was born in Windsor, Ashtabula County, Ohio to his parents Walter Luce and Mary Gray Luce.  Walter Luce, a veteran of the War of 1812 from Tolland, Connecticut, settled in the Connecticut Western Reserve after the war.  He and Mary were parents to sons Cyrus Gray, Charles Leverett, and George Lester Luce.  When he was twelve years old, young Cyrus moved west with his family to Steuben County, Indiana. After leaving school at seventeen, Cyrus Luce worked from 1841 until 1848 in a woolen mill, carding wool and dressing the unfinished cloth for sale.

Life and politics in Michigan
In 1848, Cyrus Luce was a Whig Party candidate for the Indiana House of Representatives for the district including Steuben and DeKalb counties. He lost a close election, and in the same year he purchased  of uncultivated land near Gilead, Michigan in Branch County not far from the Indiana state line.

Luce cleared the land for farming and in 1849 married Julia A. Dickinson of Gilead. Over time he expanded his landholdings with additional purchases. He became an active member of the Grange in 1874, and remained active in the organization for many years afterwards.

In 1852, he was elected to represent Gilead Township on the Branch County Board of Supervisors. In 1854, he was elected as a candidate of the newly formed Republican party to the Michigan State House of Representatives to represent Branch County's second district, serving from 1855 to 1856.  He was elected Branch County Treasurer in 1858 and again in 1860. In 1864, he was named to fill a seat which represented the 15 district in the Michigan Senate and was re-elected to the 13th district seat in 1866. In July, 1879, Luce was appointed State Oil Inspector by Governor Charles Croswell, and re-appointed by Gov. David Jerome in 1881.

His first wife Julia died in August 1882, and Luce married Mary Thompson of Bronson, Michigan in November 1883.

Running as a Republican party candidate, Luce was elected Governor of Michigan in November 1886, defeating George L. Yaple, taking office on January 1, 1887. He was reelected in 1888 and served two two-year terms.  During his tenure, a local liquor option law was sanctioned and a state game warden was established, reportedly the first salaried state game wardenship in the United States. To fill this position Luce appointed William Alden Smith, who would later represent Michigan in the U.S. Senate.

Death and legacy
Luce died at the age of 80 in Coldwater, Michigan, and is interred in Oak Grove Cemetery adjacent to that municipality.

Luce County, in the Upper Peninsula of Michigan is named for Luce.  He was the last governor of the state to have a county named in his honor.  His administration was marked by rapid population growth and development in northern Michigan, led by the lumber industry.  A state landmark, the Grand Hotel on Mackinac Island, was built in 1887 during his administration.

References

External links

Memorial Library
Michigan Historical Marker
National Governors Association

1824 births
1905 deaths
Governors of Michigan
People from Ashtabula County, Ohio
People from Branch County, Michigan
Republican Party members of the Michigan House of Representatives
Republican Party Michigan state senators
American Presbyterians
People from Coldwater, Michigan
Indiana Whigs
Burials in Michigan
County treasurers in Michigan
19th-century American politicians
Republican Party governors of Michigan